Eastern Conference or Conference East or variation, may refer to:

 Eastern Conference (MLS), one of two conferences in Major League Soccer
 Eastern Conference (NBA), one of two conferences in the National Basketball Association
 Eastern Conference (WNBA), one of two conferences in the Women's National Basketball Association
 Eastern Conference (NHL), one of two conferences in the National Hockey League
 Eastern Conference (KHL), one of two conferences in the Kontinental Hockey League
 Eastern Conference was an NCAA Division II collegiate athletic conference now called Northeast Ten Conference
 Eastern Conference Records is a record company founded by rap duo the High and Mighty
 Eastern Conference (NFL), now succeeded by AFC North and NFC East

See also

 
 
 
 Conference
 Eastern (disambiguation)
 East (disambiguation)